Fred Potter (born 29 November 1940) is an English retired footballer who played as a goalkeeper.

Career
He was born in Cradley Heath and played for his local side before signing for Aston Villa in July 1959. Originally an inside forward, he made his debut on Boxing Day 1959 and made three appearances in total in the First Division. Looking for first team football he signed for Doncaster Rovers in July 1962. He was a regular starter in the Fourth Division, making 124 league appearances.

In 1966 he moved down into non-league football with Burton Albion, winning the Player of the Year award for the 1969-70 season. John Charles, then manager of Hereford United, signed Potter in September 1970. Potter made 33 league appearances in 1970-71, with a further 27 in various cup competitions. Potter was the goalkeeper in Hereford's FA Cup run of 1971-72, notably defeating Newcastle United in the Third Round. While Ronnie Radford and Ricky George wrote their names in the history books with their goals, Potter's 38 clean sheets that season saw him named Player of the Year.

Hereford were elected to the Football League for 1972-73 but Potter made only 9 league appearances as David Icke's performances in goal kept him out of the starting eleven. Icke was forced to retire with arthritis in his knees, but Potter subsequently broke his leg on the opening day of the season. Now 33, he did not play for Hereford again.

Potter also worked in construction for Baldwin Durafencing, and since 2007 he has been living in Stourbridge near Kidderminster. Fred had three sons with his wife Margaret - Kevin, Mark and Andrew.

References

1940 births
Living people
English footballers
English Football League players
Aston Villa F.C. players
Doncaster Rovers F.C. players
Burton Albion F.C. players
Hereford United F.C. players
People from Cradley Heath
Association football forwards
Association football goalkeepers